Gać may refer to the following places in Poland:
Gać, Lower Silesian Voivodeship (south-west Poland)
Gać, Kuyavian-Pomeranian Voivodeship (north-central Poland)
Gać, Podlaskie Voivodeship (north-east Poland)
Gać, Łódź Voivodeship (central Poland)
Gać, Subcarpathian Voivodeship (south-east Poland)
Gać, Masovian Voivodeship (east-central Poland)
Gać, Gmina Główczyce in Pomeranian Voivodeship (north Poland)
Gać, Gmina Słupsk in Pomeranian Voivodeship (north Poland)